Triangle: The Fire That Changed America a detailed account of the Triangle Shirtwaist Factory fire of that occurred on March 25, 1911.

Reception
The New York Times calls it "An enthralling chronicle".

Publishers Weekly states "Von Drehle's engrossing account, which emphasizes the humanity of the victims and the theme of social justice, brings one of the pivotal and most shocking episodes of American labor history to life".

Kirkus Reviews calls it "Compelling, in-depth look at a tragedy that deserves to be better remembered".

References

2004 books